"I Dream of Jeannie Cusamano" is the 13th episode of the HBO original series The Sopranos and the finale of the show's first season. Written by David Chase and directed by John Patterson, it originally aired on April 4, 1999.

Starring
 James Gandolfini as Tony Soprano
 Lorraine Bracco as Jennifer Melfi
 Edie Falco as Carmela Soprano
 Michael Imperioli as Christopher Moltisanti
 Dominic Chianese as Corrado Soprano, Jr.
 Vincent Pastore as Pussy Bonpensiero*
 Steven Van Zandt as Silvio Dante
 Tony Sirico as Paulie Gualtieri
 Robert Iler as Anthony Soprano, Jr.
 Jamie-Lynn Sigler as Meadow Soprano
 Nancy Marchand as Livia Soprano

* = credit only

Guest starring
 John Ventimiglia as Artie Bucco
 Kathrine Narducci as Charmaine Bucco
 Frank Pellegrino as Frank Cubitoso

Also guest starring

Synopsis
Jimmy Altieri's behavior at a capo meeting convinces Tony and Junior that he is an FBI informant. Jimmy is lured into a trap by Christopher and killed by Silvio; his body is dumped in an alley with a dead rat stuffed into his mouth.

Knowing that Tony's life is in danger, Dr. Melfi openly speculates about his mother, noting that she often speaks of infanticide. She suggests that she has a borderline personality disorder, that she creates bitterness and conflict, and has no love or compassion. Tony cannot bear to hear this. He crosses over to Melfi's chair, looms over her, calls her a "twisted fucking bitch" and storms out.

Tony is brought to an FBI safehouse. Agent Cubitoso reveals that Livia's room at the retirement home was bugged, and plays recordings that confirm Tony's suspicions that the attempt on his life was planned by his uncle, goaded on by his mother.

When Tony returns to Dr. Melfi, he explains that the murder was attempted partly because he was seeing her and that her life is now in danger. He tells her to leave town. He then confides to his crew that he is seeing a psychiatrist. Though Silvio and Paulie accept it, Christopher cannot and walks out. Tony and his crew then begin to retaliate against Junior's crew, killing Chucky Signore and Mikey Palmice. However, Junior and the rest of his crew are then arrested. Tony's lawyer tells him that he was not indicted because the charges relate to a stock fraud scam in which he was not involved. Junior is offered a lesser charge if he confesses that Tony is the de facto boss of the family, but he refuses.

Carmela sees that Father Phil is now close to the recently widowed Rosalie. When he calls on Carmela, knowing she is alone at home, she rebuffs him; she tells him that he takes advantage of spiritually thirsty women and that he is somehow stimulated by the food and the sexual tension. Crushed, he leaves.

Livia is showing signs of senility, but when Artie visits her, she remembers that Tony was responsible for burning down his restaurant. He then angrily confronts Tony with a rifle, but Tony manages to persuade him that his mother is unreliable and confused. Though still enraged, Artie destroys the rifle and leaves. As time passes and his newly rebuilt restaurant is a success, he finds peace.

Tony goes to Livia's retirement home and grabs a pillow, intending to smother her. However, Livia has just had a stroke and is wheeled past Tony on a gurney. Discarding the pillow, he leans very close to her face and whispers that he knows what she did. The staff haul him off as he shouts, "Look at her face, she's smiling!"

Later that night, Tony and his family go to Artie's restaurant to wait out a thunderstorm. After a little hesitation, he welcomes them. As they eat by candlelight, Tony raises his glass to "the little moments that were good".

First appearance
 Agent Cubitoso: The FBI agent in charge of investigating the Soprano crime family and Tony Soprano.

Deceased
 Jimmy Altieri: shot by Silvio on orders from Tony Soprano.
 Chucky Signore: shot by Tony Soprano on his motorboat.
 Mikey Palmice: shot while out jogging by Christopher and Paulie on orders from Tony.

Title reference
 In a session with Dr. Melfi, Tony relates a dream he had involving neighbor Jean Cusamano. The title is also a play on the name of the TV show I Dream of Jeannie, which is, in turn, a play on the first line of the Stephen Foster song "Jeanie with the Light Brown Hair".

Cultural references 
The episode title is a nod to the 1960s I Dream of Jeannie TV series.
When A.J. is making fun of Livia after her "Who's Artie Bucco?" question, he mockingly hums the theme from Jeopardy!.
Meadow and Jeremy are watching "Planely Possible", an episode of the sci-fi/horror HBO TV Show Perversions of Science, together.
Father Phil brings Carmela a DVD of the 1998 film One True Thing, starring Renée Zellweger.
When Mikey Palmice fingers Junior for shooting Brendan Filone, Christopher expresses disbelief, calling Junior "Mr. Magoo".
When the FBI offers to play Tony portions of surveillance tape in an informal sit-down, he jokes that if it's the Springsteen CD box set, he's already got it. 
The U.S. attorney who offers Junior a deal is named Gene Conigliaro. Eugene Conigliaro was a character on a sixth-season episode of The Rockford Files, "Just a Coupla Guys." Chase wrote both scripts. Greg Antonacci, who played Conigliaro, would eventually join the show in the sixth season as New York mobster Butch DeConcini.
Tony calls a hospital worker "George Clooney", a reference to the actor's role on ER.
During the final dinner scene, Paulie calls Silvio "Pat Cooper", a reference to the famous comedian.
When advising Dr. Melfi to leave town for her own safety, Tony suggests that she tell her patients that "August came early". This is a reference to the practice of psychoanalysts to vacation in the month of August.
Being questioned while under arrest, Junior jokes to his interrogator that he would like to have sex with Angie Dickinson. This is a reference to the actress who was reputed to have had an affair with John F. Kennedy, with whom Junior is obsessed.
Christopher refers to William "Petite" Clayborn and Rasheen Ray — the gunmen contracted to kill Tony — as Boyz II Men.

Music 
The song playing at the beginning of the episode during the meeting at Satriale's is "Inside of Me" by Little Steven & The Disciples of Soul (Little Steven is the musical pseudonym of Steven Van Zandt, who plays Silvio Dante in the show).
The song played during the hotel killing scene is "Wood Cabin" by Saint Etienne.
The song played when Carmela and Rosalie have lunch at Artie's new restaurant and discuss Rosalie's grief over her husband Jackie and Carmela's fear for her own is "I'll Remember April" by Bobby Darin. 
The song played when Father Phil joins Carmela and Rosalie for lunch at Artie's new restaurant is "I've Got You Under My Skin" by Frankie Valli.  
The song played at the Bada Bing is "Groove Me" by Screamin' Cheetah Wheelies.
The song played just after Tony kills Chucky is "It's Bad You Know" by R. L. Burnside.
The choir music heard when Carmela walks in on Rosalie and Father Phil in the church is "Illumina Faciem Tuam" By Carlo Gesualdo, performed by the Oxford Camerata.
The song played when Tony is happy at breakfast is "Rave On!" by Buddy Holly. 
The song played during the montage of the Feds arresting Junior, Larry Boy, Sasso, and the other mobsters is "The Four Sections (Andrea Parker Mix)" by Steve Reich. 
The song played when Tony comes looking for Dr. Melfi is "El Gorrito" by Lucho Argain.
The song played over the end credits is "State Trooper" by Bruce Springsteen.

Filming locations 
Listed in order of first appearance:

 Satriale's Pork Store in Kearney, New Jersey
 North Caldwell, New Jersey
 Long Island City, Queens
 Dumbo, Brooklyn
 Satin Dolls in Lodi, New Jersey
 Hackensack River below Route 3 in Secaucus, New Jersey
 West Orange, New Jersey
 Wittpenn Bridge in Jersey City, New Jersey

References

External links
"I Dream of Jeannie Cusamano"  at HBO

The Sopranos (season 1) episodes
1999 American television episodes
Television episodes written by David Chase
Television episodes directed by John Patterson (director)

fr:Mise au point (Les Soprano)